White mallee is a common name for several plants and may refer to:

 Eucalyptus cylindriflora, native to Western Australia
 Eucalyptus dumosa, native to South Australia, New South Wales, and Victoria
 Eucalyptus erythronema, native to Western Australia